The 1996 Pepsi Sharjah Cup was a triangular ODI cricket competition held in Sharjah, United Arab Emirates from 12 to 19 April 1996. It featured the national cricket teams of South Africa, Pakistan and India. Its official sponsor was Pepsi. The tournament was won by South Africa, which defeated India in the final.

Tournament
The Pepsi Sharjah Cup was the second ODI tournament held after the 1996 Cricket World Cup, held immediately afterwards the 1996 Singer Cup in Singapore, which was won by Pakistan over Sri Lanka and India. The matches were held at the Sharjah Cricket Association Stadium in the emirate of Sharjah. The tournament had a round-robin series of matches, with each team playing the others twice.

Squads

Pakistan
Aamir Sohail (captain)
Waqar Younis
Inzamam-ul-Haq
Rashid Latif (wicket-keeper)
Ata-ur-Rehman
Basit Ali
Saeed Anwar
Aaqib Javed
Mushtaq Ahmed
Ijaz Ahmed
Rameez Raja
Saqlain Mushtaq
Salim Malik
Mohammad Akram

Pakistan named a 14-player side, unchanged from the squad that won the 1996 Singer Cup. Intikhab Alam served as the team coach, and Dan Kiesel as the team physiotherapist.

South Africa
Hansie Cronje (captain)
Andrew Hudson
Fanie de Villiers
Daryll Cullinan
Dave Richardson (wicket-keeper)
Pat Symcox
Gary Kirsten
Paul Adams
Brian McMillan
Shaun Pollock
Craig Matthews
Jonty Rhodes
Derek Crookes
Jacques Kallis

Bob Woolmer served as the team coach. Cassim Docrat was the team manager; Craig Smith was the physiotherapist and Paddy Upton worked as the exercise specialist.

India
Mohammad Azharuddin (captain)
Sachin Tendulkar (vice-captain)
Javagal Srinath
Ajay Jadeja
Anil Kumble
Sanjay Manjrekar
Venkatesh Prasad
Nayan Mongia (wicket-keeper)
Aashish Kapoor
Vikram Rathour
Venkatapathy Raju
Navjot Singh Sidhu
Prashant Vaidya
Rahul Dravid

India named a 14-player side unchanged from the side it fielded in the 1996 Singer Cup. Sandeep Patil served as the team coach-cum-manager. Vikram Rathour made his international debut in the tournament.

Points Table
South Africa won all of their four round-robin matches. India and Pakistan each claimed one victory over the other. Tied at 2 points each, India qualified for the final against South Africa based on superior run-rate.

Matches

Final

Records and awards
South African opening-batsman Gary Kirsten was the top run-scorer of the tournament, amassing 356 runs in 7 innings at an average of 89, with two centuries and one fifty. He was named the player of the series. Pakistani captain Aamir Sohail was the second-highest run getter, scoring 240 runs at an average of 60.

South African fast-bowler Fanie de Villiers took the most number of wickets, taking 10 wickets at an average of 19.20. Indian leg-spin bowler Anil Kumble followed with a haul of 8 wickets at an average of 26.50.

References

Pepsi Sharjah Cup, 1996
Cricket in the United Arab Emirates
International cricket competitions from 1994–95 to 1997
Indian cricket seasons from 1970–71 to 1999–2000
Pepsi Sharjah Cup, 1996
One Day International cricket competitions
1996 in Emirati cricket